Bruegel is a crater on Mercury. It has a diameter of 72 kilometers. Its name was adopted by the International Astronomical Union in 1985. Bruegel is named for the Flemish painter Pieter Bruegel the Elder, who lived from 1525 to 1569.

Bruegel is located southeast of To Ngoc Van crater, which shows evidence of volcanic activity.

References

Impact craters on Mercury
Pieter Bruegel the Elder